Malik-Shah III (died in 1160) ruled as Sultan of Great Seljuq from 1152–53. He was the son of Mahmud II of Great Seljuq. In 1153, he was deposed and was succeeded by his brother, Muhammad. Following his death in 1160, his son Mahmud was held in Istakhr by the Salghurids as a rival claimant to the Seljuq throne.

References

Seljuk rulers
1160 deaths
Year of birth unknown